Nanoro is a department or commune of Boulkiemdé Province in central Burkina Faso. As of 2005 it has a population of 33,511. Its capital lies at the town of Nanoro.

Towns and villages
NanoroBasziriBoulponDacisséGodoGoulouréGouroumbilaKokoloNazoanga
PoéssiSéguédinSittaonSoalaSoumSimidin

References

Departments of Burkina Faso
Boulkiemdé Province